Črni Potok is a former village in eastern Slovenia in the Municipality of Trebnje. It is now part of the village of Blato. It is part of the traditional region of Lower Carniola and is now included in the Southeast Slovenia Statistical Region.

Geography
Črni Potok lies northwest of the village center of Blato at the headwaters of Cedilnica Creek. It lies to the west of and above the Zajka Valley, which Zajka Creek flows through.

Name
The name Črni Potok literally means 'black creek', semantically corresponding to the German name Schwarzenbach, and it was originally a hydronym. Like similar names of streams (e.g., Črna and Črnec), the semantic motivation for the name is a creek that flows through a dark soil (i.e., non-gravel) bed or that carries dark, turbid water.

History
Črni Potok was annexed by Blato in 1953, ending its existence as a separate settlement.

References

External links
Črni Potok on Geopedia

Populated places in the Municipality of Trebnje
Former settlements in Slovenia